Sulzbach is a river of Hesse, Germany. It is a right tributary of the Nidda, into which it flows in the western part of Frankfurt, close to its discharge into the Main. It flows through Bad Soden and Sulzbach.

See also
List of rivers of Hesse

References

Rivers of Hesse
Rivers of the Taunus
Rivers of Germany